Kate Ryan (born Katrien Verbeeck, 22 July 1980) is a Belgian singer and songwriter, and the winner of a World Music Award. She began her singing career in 2001 and later found fame with a string of dance hits. These included covers, mostly of Mylène Farmer and France Gall, such as "Désenchantée", "Libertine", and "Ella, elle l'a", and Desireless' "Voyage Voyage", as well as new material. Ryan represented Belgium in the Eurovision Song Contest 2006 with "Je t'adore" coming in 12th place in the semi-final.

Biography

2001–2004: Different
Ryan was born in the small village of Tessenderlo, Belgium, and grew up in a musical family. At eight years old she learned to play piano and guitar. She received singing and piano lessons from her aunt who teaches at a conservatory. She studied at an art school, specialising in jewellery design. Ryan played frequently in bars and cafés as a teenager, and one night she was offered a recording deal. She became a member of a pop group called Melt at the age of 16. The group was active for two years, but they did not release any material commercially. When she met producer Andy Janssens, she left Melt and the pair began to write music together. Their debut single "Scream for More" was released in 2001, and it became a chart success. Later that year Ryan's second single, "UR (My Love)", cemented her position in Belgian charts.

She gained international prominence with a cover of Mylène Farmer's "Désenchantée", which was a hit in various European pop music charts. She signed in with Belgian department of EMI and released her first album Different in 2002 exclusively in Europe. The album went Gold and Platinum in a number of countries, selling more than 250.000 copies throughout Europe. Two final singles off Different, "Mon cœur résiste encore" and "Libertine" (the first one being a French version of "Scream for More", the latter a second cover of Farmer's number) also turned out a chart success. Ryan's records were released in the United States under Robbins Entertainment label.

2004–2007: Stronger and Alive
In 2004, Ryan released a second album in Europe, titled Stronger, that also contained her remarkable dance-pop style. The album's lead single, "Only If I", met with a modest success across Europe. A cover of Cock Robin's "The Promise You Made" became the second single, earning even greater success. It was also recorded in French as "La Promesse". Pop ballad "Goodbye" was released as the third single, meeting with considerable success. In 2005 Kate Ryan's music appeared in North America on Water Music Records.

In 2006, the singer participated in Eurosong '06, the national final to select the entrant for Belgium in the Eurovision Song Contest 2006. She was selected as the entrant after placing first in the Eurosong final on 9 March 2006. Ryan represented Belgium at the Eurovision semi-final held on 18 May 2006 in Athens singing "Je t'adore". However, she did not qualify for the final, finishing two places outside the advancing Top 10 (12th) with 69 points. She was later voted best dressed performer by Eurovision's independent website esctoday.com for her €14,000 outfit, later sold to raise charity funds. The following single was "Alive", taken from the album of the same name, which also featured French versions of several tracks including "Je t'adore", "Alive", and the third single, "All for You". The album, although critically acclaimed, did not repeat the success of the two previous ones.

2007–2008: Free and Essential
In 2007, Ryan had some success with the double-sided single "Voyage, voyage"/"We All Belong". The track "Voyage, voyage" was a cover of the 1986 European smash hit by Desireless, and "We All Belong" was selected as the official anthem for the EuroGames 2007 in Antwerp. In 2008, Ryan released two singles: "L.I.L.Y. (Like I Love You)" and then "Ella, elle l'a", a cover of France Gall's song.

Both tracks (as well as "Voyage Voyage" and "We All Belong") were included on her album Free, which was released in the middle of the year. The album included a duet with Spanish singer Soraya Arnelas. Ryan's first best-of album, Essential, was released in July. It included songs recorded throughout her EMI period. In August she took part in Polish Sopot Hit Festival. During the show she received a Gold award for the Free album in Poland. On 9 November 2008 in Monaco, she won the World Music Award for Best Selling Benelux Artist. Two more singles promoted Free, including "I Surrender".

2009–2011: French Connection
2009 saw the release of the concept album French Connection. It was a compilation consisting of only French-language material, including Ryan's previous hits, and adding some new recordings. "Évidemment" and "Babacar", both from France Gall's repertoire, were released as singles, but met with limited success, as did the album. The singer announced that French Connection was the end of an era, and from now on she will only release material written by her. She received a Multi-Platinum award from Spain for selling more than 300.000 digital songs.

2011–2012: Electroshock
Ryan announced via Facebook that her next album, Electroshock, would be released in 2011, preceded by a single "LoveLife".

Another single, "Broken", was released on 7 October 2011. On 9 December 2011, she appeared as musical guest on The Voice of Romania.

The album, which was delayed, was released on 25 June 2012. The album is entirely containing songs in English and has no cover version included. On 12 May 2012, another single, entitled "Robots", was released.

2013–present: non-album singles
After Electroshock was released, Ryan expressed via Facebook her intention to only release non-album singles, as she feels that the music industry is changing, by the fact that almost nobody buys full albums anymore, with iTunes. She started this purpose releasing the non-album singles "Light in the Dark", released via iTunes on 24 May 2013, and "Heart Flow", released on 13 August 2013. "Heart Flow" was also the anthem of the World Outgames 2013. On December 2013, she recorded "Sé que tu lluitaràs", a Catalan-language cover of Bob Sinclar's song "World, Hold On (Children of the Sky)". It was included on the various artists compilation El disc de la Marató 2013 (TV3).

On 1 September 2014, Ryan released a new song via iTunes, "Not Alone", which is a Franco-English song.

In August 2015, Ryan released a new single via iTunes, "Runaway (Smalltown Boy)", which is a cover of British band Bronski Beat's song "Smalltown Boy". The song is also included on the various artists compilation MNM Summertime 2015.

In January 2016, Ryan released another single via iTunes, this time a cover of British singer Black's song "Wonderful Life". In June 2016, she released a new single via iTunes, "Comment te dire adieu", a cover of the song by French singer Françoise Hardy, which is also a French-language cover of the song "It Hurts to Say Goodbye", originally performed by American singer Margaret Whiting.

Discography

Studio albums
 Different (2002)
 Stronger (2004)
 Alive (2006)
 Free (2008)
 Electroshock (2012)

References

External links

 
 

1980 births
Belgian techno musicians
Living people
Eurodance musicians
Eurovision Song Contest entrants for Belgium
Eurovision Song Contest entrants of 2006
Flemish musicians
People from Limburg (Belgium)
French-language singers of Belgium
English-language singers from Belgium
Robbins Entertainment artists
World Music Awards winners
21st-century Belgian women singers
21st-century Belgian singers
Ministry of Sound artists